Khairul Idham Pawi (born 20 September 1998) is a Malaysian motorcycle racer. He is the youngest non-European to win a Grand Prix, accomplishing this feat in the Argentine race of the 2016 Moto3 World Championship, aged just 17.

Career

Moto3 World Championship
He made his Grand Prix debut as wildcard at the 2015 Aragon motorcycle Grand Prix, entered by Honda Team Asia, where he finished the race in 25th place.

In 2016, Pawi made his full-time debut in the 2016 Moto3 World Championship, once again riding the Honda of Honda Team Asia, alongside Japanese rider Hiroki Ono. Pawi won the second Grand Prix of the season in a wet Argentina race, becoming the youngest non-European rider to win a race, aged 17. Later in the season at the German Grand Prix, Pawi started from only 20th on the grid, but established himself as a wet-weather specialist, as he charged through to lead after just six laps. He took the win by over 11 seconds from Andrea Locatelli, moving up to 10th in the rider's standings. He finished the year 19th in the championship, with 62 points.

Moto2 World Championship
Following his two victories, for the 2017 Moto2 World Championship Pawi was promoted to partner Takaaki Nakagami in Idemitsu Honda Team Asia, replacing Ratthapark Wilairot in the Moto2 category. In just his second year in Grand Prix motorcycle racing, Pawi struggled to adjust to the bigger and faster bikes, scoring points in only two races during the season, finishing 27th in the standings, with 10 points.

Pawi stayed with Honda Asia Team for the 2018 Moto2 World Championship, this time partnered by Tetsuta Nagashima. Pawi had his worst season yet, only scoring one point during the season, a 15th place finish in France.

For the 2019 Moto2 World Championship, Pawi started off with a 13th place finish in Argentina, before suffering a Grade 3 open fracture of his little finger, in a crash during Friday practice at the 2019 Spanish motorcycle Grand Prix. He returned at the 2019 Czech Republic motorcycle Grand Prix but withdrew after the Friday practice sessions due to the injury and missed the rest of the season. He finished the season 30th and last in the standings, having only completed three races, and amassing 3 points in an injury-riddled season.

Second Moto3 World Championship stint
Being replaced in Moto2 by Somkiat Chantra, Pawi returned to Moto3 for the 2020 season, but struggled on the smaller bikes, and scored no points during the year.

In May 2021, following no offers from motorcycle grand prix racing teams, Pawi announced his surprise retirement, aged only 22.

Malaysian Superbike Championship
In 2021, he made a comeback from retirement to join the TKKR Racing team for the remainder of the 2021 Malaysian superbike races, picking up two podiums, including a win. He finished the season in 4th place (out of 9 riders) with 72 points.

Asia Road Racing Championship

Boon Siew Honda Malaysia

After a fantastic result back in Malaysia Superbike , Pawi made a return to the asia scene where he joins Boon Siew Honda Malaysia to race in Supersport Category partnering up with Azroy Hakeem Anuar and Helmi Azman riding the latest Honda CBR-600RR.

Career statistics

Pre-Grand Prix career highlights

2012–11th, Malaysian Cub Prix WIRA Championship #45    Honda
2013–7th, Malaysian Cub Prix WIRA Championship #26    Honda
2013–4th, Asia Dream Cup #10    Honda CBR250R
2014–1st, Malaysian Cub Prix WIRA Championship #28    Honda
2014–1st, Asia Dream Cup #1    Honda CBR250R
2015–6th, FIM CEV Moto3 Junior World Championship #98    Honda NSF250R
2016-19th, FIM Moto3 World Championship #89 Honda Team Asia
2017-27th, FIM Moto2 World Championship #89 Honda Team Asia

Grand Prix motorcycle racing

By season

By class

Races by year
(key) (Races in bold indicate pole position; races in italics indicate fastest lap)

ARRC Supersports 600

Races by year
(key) (Races in bold indicate pole position; races in italics indicate fastest lap)

References

External links

1998 births
Malaysian motorcycle racers
Malaysian Muslims
Living people
People from Perak
Moto3 World Championship riders
Moto2 World Championship riders